The Sisterhood of Karn is a fictional religious cult that appears in the British science fiction television series Doctor Who. Residing on the planet Karn, the Sisterhood was introduced in the 1976 serial The Brain of Morbius, and later appearing in the 2013 mini episode "The Night of the Doctor" and the 2015 episodes "The Magician's Apprentice" and "Hell Bent".

They are the guardians and worshippers of the Sacred Flame, which provides for them the Elixir of Life and thus grants them immortality. They are in some way related to, and affiliated with, the Time Lords, the species of which the show's protagonist, the Doctor, is a member.

Backstory

In The Brain of Morbius, details of Sisterhood's religious practices are abundant and much is made of their tempestuous relationships with other species.

They are led by Maren, already old at the Elixir's discovery, and worship the "Sacred Flame", which furnishes them with the "Elixir of Life" and provides them with their mighty power, thus it fades when they are away from the flame. Only the Time Lords, with whom they have shared the Elixir since the "Time of the Stones", parallel them in mental ability; while other races they can "destroy from within", the Time Lords can resist their influence – a strength which allows Morbius to reside on Karn undetected. The Time Lords themselves use their Elixir sparingly, only, for example, if they encounter difficulty when regenerating.

The flame itself is, according to the Doctor, the product of gases rising from the molten core of the planet up to the surface through a geological fault, and thus is to burn for millions of years. Apparently, the Elixir tastes of "stewed apricots – no custard".

They are revealed to have become paranoid after their betrayal by Morbius, who, having promised immortality to his followers, laid waste to Karn in search of their life-giving Elixir.

It is further revealed that prior to Morbius' revelation, only the High Council of the Time Lords knew of the Elixir and that, since their betrayal, the Sisters have been using their considerable mental powers to crash passing spacecraft onto the surface of Karn for fear of their taking the Sacred Flame.

Over a year prior to the events of The Brain of Morbius, the Flame, clogged with soot, began to fade and Elixir stopped being produced and so, by the time of the main events of the episode, Maren has for months been attempting to rekindle the flame with powdered rineweed.

By the time of the 2013 mini-episode "The Night of the Doctor", the Sisterhood has "elevated" "Time Lord science" so that not only can their elixir trigger regeneration, but different potions can be prepared which can cause specific changes in the Time Lord's new body. The Eighth Doctor uses this upgraded elixir to save himself and consciously opts to become "a warrior", regenerating into the War Doctor. However, in his novelisation of the story, Steven Moffat explains the sisters gave the Doctor lemonade, lying about the elixir to convince him to regenerate into a warrior.

The Sisterhood is able to prevent Colony Sarff, an agent of Davros, from separating into his individual components and attacking them ("The Magician's Apprentice"). Whether this is due to the atmosphere of Karn or their own mental powers is unrevealed.

TV appearances 

In the serial The Brain of Morbius, the Fourth Doctor (Tom Baker) is accused of being sent by the Time Lords to steal the Elixir. The Doctor denies this, saying that the last thing he remembers is having wine with Solon and Morbius, but Morbius is dead, executed by the Time Lords on Karn for leading a rebellion. His body was placed in a dispersal chamber and atomised. The Doctor realises that just before he passed out, he felt the mind of Morbius. The Sisters refuse to believe that Morbius is alive and says that the Doctor will join him in death shortly. The Sisters gather wood to burn the Doctor at the stake. The Doctor points out that the Time Lords have always been friendly to the Sisterhood — they saved them when Morbius overran the planet. The Sisters are unconvinced, and they tie the Doctor to the stake while chanting the Song of Death. At the last moment, the Doctor is rescued by his companion Sarah Jane Smith (Elisabeth Sladen), and makes his way to safety. After the Doctor re-kindles the Sacred Flame and deals with Morbius, he is reconciled with the Sisterhood, and they part amicably.

In the mini-episode "The Night of the Doctor", the mortally-injured Eighth Doctor (Paul McGann) is taken in by the Sisterhood of Karn, who revive him temporarily. The Sisterhood's leader, Ohila (Clare Higgins), offers the Doctor a selection of potions which, if consumed before he expires, will not only trigger his regeneration into a new form, but allow him to choose which characteristics his next incarnation will have. They convince the Doctor that he must take action to end the Time War, which "threatens all reality". The Doctor's initial rejection is met by the response that he is "dead already; how many more will you let join you?", and the Sisters beg him not to allow the universe to fall, as it presently "stands on the brink". The Doctor acknowledges there is not much need for a doctor any more, salutes the memory of his past companions, and asks for a potion that will turn him into "a warrior". He utters his last words ("Physician, heal thyself") and, after drinking it, regenerates into a new incarnation, known as the War Doctor (John Hurt), who declares, "Doctor no more."

Karn and Ohila, the head of the Sisterhood, reappear in the 2015 mini-prologue to the Twelfth Doctor story "The Magician's Apprentice". Ohila tells the Doctor that someone is searching for him. The Doctor states he will confront his pursuer and gives Ohila his "confession dial" – a Time Lord's last will and testament – knowing she knows whom to deliver it to. Karn and the Sisterhood also appear, hiding the Doctor, in the broadcast episode itself. Davros' agent Colony Sarff tries to attack the Sisterhood, but his powers are neutralised on Karn, and he retreats. When the Doctor returns to Gallifrey in "Hell Bent", the Sisterhood appear unannounced in the High Council of Gallifrey's chamber to tell Rassilon (Donald Sumpter) that the Doctor blames only him for the horrors of the Time War. Ohila is dismayed as the Doctor flees Gallifrey with his companion Clara (Jenna Coleman) in an attempt to cheat her death.

Audio dramas 
The Sisterhood of Karn also feature in the Big Finish Productions audio dramas Zagreus and the two-part story Sisters of the Flame/Vengeance of Morbius.

References

Doctor Who organisations